Nita Fernando (born 5 September 1947, නීටා ප්‍රනාන්දු) in Negombo, Sri Lanka is an actress in the Sri Lankan cinema. She has starred in films like Duhulu Malak and Pavuru Walalu.

Biography

Early life
Nita Fernando was the eldest of four children. She studied at Holy Family Convent Wennappuwa.

Personal life
Fernando gave up acting after her marriage to lawyer Elian Perera in 1975 and moved to Canada where she worked as receptionist at the Montreal General Hospital.

Career

Nita Fernando made her screen debut in Landaka Mahima alongside Joe Abeywickrama in 1965. Over the next eight years, she made over 40 films e.g. Duhulu Malak, Lasanda, Hadawath Neththo, Mangala, Wasana and Shanthi.

Fernando obtained her first film role in Gamini Fonseka's Parasathu Mal. She was unable to appear in the film however because her parents didn't approve. Discouraged, she toyed with the idea of becoming a teacher before she returned to acting after finishing schooling. Her interest in film was supported by her uncle.

In 1983 she briefly returned to film, producing and starring in Sooriyakantha. She kept a low profile subsequently until 1998 when she played Violet in the Prasanna Vithanage film Pavuru Walalu. 
 
The role won her international acclaim netting her a Best Actress Award at the 1998 International Singapore Film Festival, the Vishwa Kirthie award, Presidential award and the Critics award in 1999 and OCIC award for Best Actress in 2000 in Sri Lanka.

In 2020, she won the Best Actress award at the 2019 Nice International Film Festival in France.

Filmography

References

External links

Nita Fernando's Biography in Sinhala Cinema Database
Official Website - National Film Corporation of Sri Lanka
Infolanka.com: Spotlight - Nita Fernando
පේමක්කා මගේ හිතේ ඉහළම තැනක රැඳී ඉන්නවා

Living people
Sri Lankan film actresses
20th-century Sri Lankan actresses
21st-century Sri Lankan actresses
People from Negombo
Kala Suri
1947 births